Sociedad Deportiva España was an Ecuadorian football club based in Quito. Founded in 1951, the club last 10 years after a pair of participations in the Serie A, The club dissolved after ten years of existence when it ceded its team to Club Deportivo Politécnico.

Achievements
Campeonato Profesional Interandino
Runner-up (1): 1958, 1959, 1961

References

Defunct football clubs in Ecuador
Association football clubs established in 1951
Association football clubs disestablished in 1962
1951 establishments in Ecuador
1962 disestablishments in Ecuador